Broadus Milburn "Bruce" Connatser (September 19, 1902 – January 27, 1971) was an American Major League Baseball first baseman who played in 35 MLB games over two seasons for the Cleveland Indians (–).

The native of Sevierville, Tennessee, attended the University of Alabama.

External links

1902 births
1971 deaths
Baseball players from Tennessee
Chattanooga Lookouts players
Cleveland Indians players
Dallas Steers players
Detroit Tigers scouts
Jackson Senators players
Kansas City Blues (baseball) players
Major League Baseball first basemen
New Orleans Pelicans (baseball) players
Pensacola Pilots players
Philadelphia Phillies scouts
Terre Haute Tots players
Tulsa Oilers (baseball) players
Vicksburg Hill Billies players
People from Sevierville, Tennessee